Juab High School  is a public high school located in Nephi, Utah, at the base of Mount Nebo.

The school serves about 860 students in grades 9 to 12 in the Juab School District. It is the only high school in the Juab School District. The current school building was built in 1999.

Juab High School has three major publications. Chief of these is The Clarion, the student newspaper that comes out once a month.  A second publication, the Nebonian, is the yearbook that is produced each year.  JHS also prints a yearly literary magazine,  Epiphany.

School song
Verse 1
'Neath the majestic guard of Nebo
And blending with the clear blue sky
Stands the Master of our valley
Behold our dear Juab High

Chorus
Oh we love our Juab High School
And our songs to your praise we'll sing
For the Crimson and Gold
Its colors high we will hold
Yes we'll ever be true to thee.

Verse 2
We will hail its victors and leaders
Yes, many who are worthy of praise
Whose deeds beneath our mighty emblem
Our banner supreme we raise.

Verse 3
When these joyous days are ended
Which memories will time defy
Of friendship and of days of pleasure
In this, our dear Juab High.

Notable alumni
Brandon Flowers, lead singer of band The Killers; attended for grades 9-11

References

External links
Juab High School website
Juab High School at greatschools.net
"The Clarion" website

Public high schools in Utah
Schools in Juab County, Utah
School buildings completed in 1999
1999 establishments in Utah